Sports hall Boro Churlevski,, formerly known as Sports hall "Mladost" is a multi-purpose sports arena located in Bitola, Republic of Macedonia!. It was built in 1975 by the citizens of Bitola and is mainly used for handball by RK Eurofarm Pelister, and for basketball by KK Pelister. There is also room for bowling and table tennis plus it has been used for concerts. 
The Arena hosted the 2007 Macedonian Basketball Cup. This sports hall was the largest on the territory of Republic Macedonia before the construction of the Boris Trajkovski Sports Center in Skopje.

Renovation 2009 
On 21 July 2009, the arena is undergoing renovation. A new parquet floor will be installed along with new seats. The locker rooms will also be updated to meet EHF standards. Total cost of the project is about €30,000.

Renovation of Interior
In January 2017, renovation of interior of the hall  started. The renovation covered the floor, the stands, a new score board and a new heating system. The first match in the renovated arena was played on April 6, 2017 with the match between RK Pelister and RK Metalurg in the second round of the handball Super League play-off.

Renaming
At the end of July 2018, the name of the hall was changed to "Boro Churlevski", in honor of the late Boro Churlevski, a former handball player from Bitola.
Handball: 3,500
Basketball: 5,000
Concerts: 8,000 (with standing public ramp)

Concerts
Parni Valjak
Lepa Brena
Plavi orkestar
Crvena jabuka
Hari Mata Hari
Riblja Čorba
Leb i sol
Bajaga i Instruktori
Novi fosili
Bijelo Dugme
Galija
YU grupa
Kerber

References

Indoor arenas in North Macedonia
Multi-purpose stadiums in North Macedonia
Sport in Bitola
Basketball venues in North Macedonia
Buildings and structures in Bitola